The following is a timeline of the presidency of Donald Trump during the first quarter of 2020, from January 1 to March 31, 2020. To navigate quarters, see timeline of the Donald Trump presidency.

Timeline

Overview

President Trump begins the fourth year of his presidency at his Mar-a-Lago estate in Florida. Major General Qasem Solemani is assassinated, severely escalating tensions between Iran and the U.S., culminating in an attack by Iran on American military bases in Iraq and the crash of Ukrainian airlines flight 752. President Trump faced an impeachment trial in the Senate, for which he was ultimately acquitted, delivered his third state of the union address, the ongoing presidential primaries, the global COVID-19 pandemic, and the riots protesting the murder of George Floyd.

January 2020

February 2020

March 2020

See also
 Presidential transition of Donald Trump
 First 100 days of Donald Trump's presidency
 List of executive actions by Donald Trump
 List of presidential trips made by Donald Trump (international trips)

References

2020 Q1
Presidency of Donald Trump
January 2020 events in the United States
February 2020 events in the United States
March 2020 events in the United States
2020 timelines
Political timelines of the 2020s by year
Articles containing video clips